Tahrehdan (also Romanized as Tahrehdān; also known as Tahredān, Tahrezān, and Tahr Rāneh) is a village in Eshkanan Rural District, Eshkanan District, Lamerd County, Fars Province, Iran. At the 2006 census, its population was 8, in 5 families.

References 

Populated places in Lamerd County